Bayside Rugby Football Club (nicknamed Bayside Sharks) is a Canadian rugby union club that is based in White Rock, British Columbia. Established in 1988, the club regularly competes in the top division of British Columbia rugby and has contributed many players to representative teams at the provincial as well as international level. The club will play in the British Columbia Premiership for the 2012-13 season.

History

The Bayside Sharks Rugby Football Club was born through the merging of the Tsawwassen and Semiahmoo Old Boys (SOB'S) rugby clubs in 1988. Since that time the club has found themselves in the British Columbia Premiership final twice, unfortunately coming out empty handed both times. The Sharks won promotion to the premier division of British Columbia rugby for the 2012-13 season despite a 36-24 loss against Vancouver Rowing Club in the 2011-12 BC League One final. The Clubs President is currently Kevin Whitmarsh.

Facilities

The club play their home games at South Surrey Athletic Park.

Titles

Rounsefell Cup: 0

References

External links
Bayside Sharks Rugby

Rugby union teams in British Columbia